A statue of Gouverneur K. Warren by artist Henry Baerer is installed in Brooklyn's Grand Army Plaza, in the U.S. state of New York. The bronze sculpture of Warren in military garb rests on a Conway green granite pedestal quarried from Little Round Top. It was cast in 1893, commissioned by the G.K. Warren Post, No. 286, G.A.R. for $10,000, and dedicated on June 26, 1896. The memorial was cleaned in 1938, and conserved in 2001.

References

1890s establishments in New York (state)
1893 sculptures
Bronze sculptures in Brooklyn
Granite sculptures in New York City
Monuments and memorials in Brooklyn
Grand Army Plaza
Outdoor sculptures in Brooklyn
Sculptures of men in New York City
Statues in New York City